The list of ship decommissionings in 1912 includes a chronological list of ships decommissioned in 1912.  In cases where no official decommissioning ceremony was held, the date of withdrawal from service may be used instead.


References

See also 

1912
 Ship decommissionings
Ship decommissionings
Ship decommissionings